Falko Steinbach (born 30 September 1957 in Aachen, Germany) is a German/American pianist, composer and piano pedagogue. As a Steinway Artist,  Steinbach is an expert in the classical repertory, but is also a specialist in contemporary music, acclaimed for his inexhaustible fantasy, “mesmerizing sound,” and versatile piano technique. In 1999 he joined the music faculty at the University of New Mexico and became a full professor of piano in 2010. He was granted US citizenship in 2011, and now as a dual national, he continues an extended international performance career as a soloist, recording artist and collaborative performer in America, Europe and Asia. He is a noted teacher of piano and composition, and author of several significant pedagogical works including an acclaimed volume on piano methodology, “A Compendium of Piano Technique”. He is frequently invited to give lectures, master classes, and recitals at international music festivals, academic conferences, and universities worldwide, and to act as judge for national and international piano competitions

Biography

Childhood and education 
Steinbach was born in Aachen, and is the eldest of four children. His father, Dr. Hans Horst Steinbach, was a chemist and researcher who married Martha Gawellek, a chemical technical assistant who left her career to become a full-time homemaker and parent shortly after their marriage. Dr H. H. Steinbach accepted a position with the Bayer Corporation as a researcher and inventor when his son was two years old, and the family relocated to Leverkusen for the next three years. They then took up a more permanent residence in nearby Bergisch Gladbach, Schildgen where the young Steinbach would attend elementary school after age five. The elder Steinbach became a talented and successful chemist, and developed hundreds of patented chemical compounds, solutions, and lubricants as a researcher with Bayer, and his career, which extended beyond Germany to South Africa and South America, brought the family into contact with diverse cultural influences since they frequently hosted guests from around the world.

Steinbach’s exceptional musical talent became evident by the time he was four years of age, and his father, a pianist and violin player, became his first music teacher. At age six, he began to study with Grete Selle in Leverkusen, and by age seven, he began to compose small minuets and other pieces in the style of W. A. Mozart.  Steinbach was enrolled in the Freiherr vom Steim Gymnasium at age ten, and at twelve years of age, he composed his first three-movement sonatina for violin and piano under the supervision of his music instructor, Manfred Klink. That same year, Steinbach gave his first public performance as a piano soloist in Horrem near Cologne.  Before he was even eighteen years old, Steinbach was appointed choir director at the Catholic Parish, Herz Jesu Schlidgen in Bergisch-Gladbach by his mentor Dr. Paul Adenauer, son of the first Chancellor of the BRD Konrad Adenauer. He further demonstrated his musical skill in this capacity, gaining notoriety as conductor, performer and composer of several masses and a piano concerto. While working in this capacity, Steinbach concurrently attended the Rheinische Musikschule in Cologne where he studied theory and composition with Georg Kröll. He won first prize in the 1976 “Jugend musiziert” Piano Competition in Bergisch-Gladbach, and before his graduation from the Gymnasium later that year, he became a “Jungstudent” at the Musikhochschule Köln. He was a teaching assistant to his performance instructor, Prof. Tiny Wirtz, during his first year in the program, and completed the MM with distinction, followed by the Konzertexamen (a degree equivalent to the DMA) in solo performance studies.

From 1986 to ‘87, Steinbach pursued advanced postgraduate studies in solo piano performance at the Guildhall School of Music and Drama in London, and while there was a student of Craig Sheppard and assistant to Peter Feuchtwanger. During this time, he also undertook solo and collaborative studies with several noted teachers and performers including the aforementioned Peter Feuchtwanger, Tatjana Nikolajewa, Boris Pergamenschikov, Members of the Amadeus Quartet, and later with Dietrich Fischer-Dieskau in 1991. His time in London was one of the most significant experiences in his musical life.

Performer, composer and teacher 

Steinbach’s performance career since the 1980s has included solo recitals, as well as collaborative performances with other soloists, chamber ensembles, and orchestras in the United States, Europe, and Asia. He is regularly invited to perform at international music festivals, and in addition to giving approximately thirty concerts each year he continues to be an active recording artist of repertory extending from Bach to contemporary piano music. Steinbach has been critically acclaimed for his individual and deeply philosophical ‘metaphysical’ approach to his craft. He is a passionate promoter of new music, and frequently premieres new works, many of which are written for, and dedicated to him in lecture recitals. He has recorded over fifteen albums of Baroque, Classical, Romantic, and Contemporary music with Ambitus, Edition Antes, Centaur Records and Navona Records, and has also completed recordings for the WDR and NDR radio broadcasters. He has also appeared on German, Malaysian, and US radio and television as a performer, and scholarly expert in the field. Within his extensive catalog are the first recordings of many of the works of Hans Eisler, P. Dessau, and Kurt Schwaen, as well as his own works and those of many other composers. Steinbach’s artistry is also, in his terms, driven by a proactive engagement with humanitarian programs working against discrimination. In addition to numerous benefit concert performances, proceeds from his album, “Klassik für Menschenrechte” listing works of Bach, Beethoven, Mozart, Chopin and Bartók, were donated to the Casa Alianza Children’s Aid of Guatemala, and Amnesty International. Similarly proceeds from the album, “Humanity Classics,” financed by the Landschaftsverband Rheinland and featuring piano concertos by Mozart and Schnittke, were donated to the recovery and treatment of the women victimized by the Soviet-era Bulgarian treatment facility, Malko Scharkovo.

From the time of his early studies, Steinbach was most interested in performing and only in his teenage years did he begin to focus on composition studies with greater concentration. By the time he was twenty-four years of age, he opted to formally study theory and composition at the Musikhochschule Köln with Prof. Manfred Reiter, and Prof. Roland Löbner. He completed his first serious piece, “Suite in Three Movements” for piano in 1982, and shortly after completed his theory studies to earn a Staatsexamen (equivalent to a modern“Bachelor’s Degree). He has since continued to develop his compositional process using unique approaches to dodecaphony, rotational systems and set class transformation, points of symmetrical inversion, stylistic synthesis, and jazz-influenced patterns and rhythms. Steinbach believes that “to study composition with a teacher is a contradiction in itself. Nowadays it is absurd to talk about tonality or atonality. Both terms are redundant if you perceive music through rotational systems, movement and emotions. There are no rules and fashions for me.” His oeuvre encompasses almost fifty compositions, including one opera entitled “Berlin Suite,” the church music cycle “Apocalypse,” numerous major cycles for choir and various ensembles, piano ensembles and noted cycles of etudes and other works for solo piano. Many of his compositions are commissioned works such as his “Agnes Mass” (2002) written for the 100th anniversary of the Church of St. Agnes in Cologne, and "Mystic Circle" for small ensemble (2013), an homage to Igor Strawinsky written for the John Donald Robb Composer Symposium in 2013.

Steinbach is recognized worldwide for his “inexhaustible fantasy,” his “mesmerizing sound” and his sharp understanding of the possibilities of playing piano and understanding its physical, spiritual and mental aspects. His work emphasizes the careful production of tone quality in all musical contexts, and in particular, the relationship between movements and the sounds they produce; with respect to his unique approach to piano music, he explains “sound is the gate to our emotions – you can see the sound and hear the movements performed on the piano” in these works. Steinbach has spent much of his composition, performing and teaching career exploring the effects of both listening to, and performing music on human sensory process and cognition. In relation to these insights, one finds in his works unique and thoughtful attention to aspects of sound, space, time, and physical movements both in surface details, and within the larger structure of many works, such as those found in his cycles of etudes. His largest etude cycle, “Figures” has been the subject of two doctoral dissertations. The first, "The Interdependence of Movement and Sound in all Aspects of Piano in Falko Steinbach's "Figures"- 17 Choreographic Etudes for Piano (2006.)" was published in 2010 by Taiwanese pianist, Shu Ching Cheng, at the University of Arizona. The second, "A Structural Analysis for Performers: Falko Steinbach’s "Figures: 17 Choreographic Etudes for Piano," was published in 2012 by American pianist, Alexander Schwarzkopf at the University of Oregon. Steinbach’s passion and dedication for both artistic and pedagogic work are reflected in his 53 piano etudes “Figures,” “Moving,” “Finger Paintings,” “Mirror Visions,” and “Etude 53,” and in his comprehensive text, “A Compendium of Piano Technique.” The methods presented in these works provide guidance for students at beginning, intermediate, and advanced skill level, and because of the breadth and consistency of his approach, his students are among the noted performers in the state of New Mexico, and the surrounding region; many of these students have achieved professional and academic positions, scholarships, grants, and prizes at piano competitions and universities. Steinbach has given master courses at universities and music festivals in Germany, Italy, The United States, Mexico, Taiwan and Malaysia and has acted as a juror for many national and international piano competitions.

Honorary activities 
Steinach co-founded the "Initiative for the Enrichment of Culture" to benefit and promote musicians, composers and artists in 1987 in Hückeswagen, Germany, and was a member of the board of directors for several years after. He then co-founded an association for contemporary music, “Klang Köln e.V.,” in 1991, and, was acting chair and associate chair until 2000. While a member of this organization, he performed, and made recordings with many noted performers and singers including Francoise Groben, Tina von Altenstadt, Anne Schwanewilms and Marlene Mild, and worked with fellow composers, Christoph Maria Wagner, Stefan Thomas, Oliver Trötschel and Thomas Reiner. He was artistic director of the “Tage Neuer Musik,” 2001 In Brauweiler, Germany, and was also the artistic director for The "Streams" Music Festival in 2010 and 2013, which featured numerous contemporary composers including Maurizio Kagel, Kurt Schwaen, Barbara Rettagliati, Massimo Berzolla, Martin Christoph Redel, Alexander Litvinowski, Christopher Shultis and others. Since 2004, he has been a board member of “der Abtei Brauweiler” Concert Series, and in 2009 he founded the "Internationales Klavierfestival Lindlar" near Cologne. He is the current artistic director for this festival, which has become a significant and highly acclaimed cultural event in the region.

Achievements and recognition
In 1986 Steinbach was awarded a DAAD scholarship from the German government to fund his advanced studies in England. He received two grants in 1997 and 98 from the “Stiftung Kunst und Kultur” of the state North Rhine-Westphalia to produce the album, “Six Take,” as well as “Lieder aus dem Exil,” a WDR produced CD with soprano Marlene Mild. In 1999 he received a grant from The University of New Mexico to translate his German-language volume on piano technique, “Klaviertechnisches Kompendium,” into English, and in 2006 he received another UNM grant to publish his etude cycle, “Figures” – 17 Choreographic Etudes for Piano.” He received grants in 2008, including a RAC grant from UNM, to publish his recording of "Figures" with Centaur Records. The "Internationales Klavierfestival Lindlar", which he founded received the "Student Abroad Funding" award of the University of New Mexico in 2014. Steinbach is a member of GEMA. Verlag Edmund Bieler, Cologne, currently publishes his compositions.

Personal life
He currently lives with his second wife Emily and his three children Tankred Noel, Ronja Magdalena and Sebastian Miles in Albuquerque, New Mexico – U.S.A. and in Lindlar, Germany.

Steinbach is fan of association football, and is an avid supporter of the Bundesliga club Bayer 04 Leverkusen.

Compositions

List of CD recordings

Radio productions

World premieres

References

External links
Official website
Klavierfestival-Lindlar

German pianists
German composers
1957 births
Living people
People from Aachen
20th-century American pianists
American male pianists
21st-century American pianists
20th-century American male musicians
21st-century American male musicians